The Sibe or Xibo, are a Tungusic-speaking East Asian ethnic group living mostly in Xinjiang, Jilin and Shenyang in Liaoning. The Sibe form one of the 56 ethnic groups officially recognized by China, and had a recorded population of 190,481 in the 2010 Chinese Census, comprising just over 0.014% of China's total population.

Nomenclature
The Sibe are known by several variations of their name. The self-appellation of the Sibe people is pronounced Śivə, the official Chinese term is Xibo, in Russian literature the terms Сибинцы (sibintsy) and Шибинцы (shibintsy) are used, while in English works the name Sibe has been established, which corresponds to the written form.

History

According to the Russian scholar Elena P. Lebedeva, the Sibe people originated as a southern, Tungusic-speaking offshoot of the ancient Shiwei people. They lived in small town-like settlements, a portion of them nomadic, in the Songyuan and Qiqihar areas of what is now Jilin.

When the Buyeo kingdom was conquered by the Xianbei in 286, the southern Shiwei started practicing agriculture. Some historians have theorized that the Xianbei were the direct progenitors of the Sibe, a theory described as politically motivated. Pamela Kyle Crossley writes the Xianbei might have undergone a language shift from an earlier Turkic or proto-Mongolian language to a Tungusic one. However, the name "Sibe" was not used in historical records during Xianbei times.

The Han dynasty, Cao Wei and the Jin dynasty (266–420) at times controlled the Sibe until the advent of the Göktürks, who accorded the Sibe lower status than did the Chinese dynasties. At the height of their territorial dispersion, the Sibe lived in an area bounded by Jilin to the east, Hulunbuir to the west, the Nen River to the north and the Liao River to the south. After the fall of the Liao dynasty, the Sibe became vassals of the Khorchin Mongols who moved to the Nen and Songhua river valleys in 1438 after the Khorchin were defeated by the Oirats.

Nurhaci, the founder of the Manchu people, routed the Sibe during the battle of Gure in 1593 on his way to founding the Qing dynasty of China. From that point, the Qing contracted the Sibe for logistical support against the Russian Empire's expansionism on China's northern border. Crossley claims that the Sibe were so "well known to Russians moving toward the Pacific" that the Russians named Siberia after them. In 1692, the Khorchin dedicated the Sibe, the Gūwalca and the Daur to the Kangxi Emperor in exchange for silver. The Sibe were incorporated into the Eight Banners and were stationed in Qiqihar and other cities in Northeast China.

In 1700, some 20,000 Qiqihar Sibes were resettled in Hohhot (modern Inner Mongolia); 36,000 Songyuan Sibes were resettled in Shenyang, Liaoning. The relocation of the Sibe from Qiqihar is believed by Gorelova to be linked to the Qing's complete annihilation of the Manchu clan Hoifan (Hoifa) in 1697 and the Manchu tribe Ula in 1703 after they revolted against the Qing. According to Jerry Norman, after a revolt by the Qiqihar Sibes in 1764, the Qianlong Emperor ordered an 800-man military escort to transfer 18,000 Sibe to the Ili River of Dzungaria.

In Ili, the Xinjiang Sibe built Buddhist monasteries and cultivated vegetables, tobacco and poppies. The Sibe population declined after the Qing used them to suppress the Dungan Revolt (1862–77) by the Hui and to fight against the Russian occupation of Ili during the revolt. The scarcity of provisions in Ili became such that the Governor at last saw himself obliged to dismiss his last auxiliaries, the Thagor Kalmuks. In the meantime both Solons and Sibos were being attacked and plundered and were obliged to make peace with the insurgents, so that only Ili, Khorgos, Losigun and Suidun, remained in the hands of the Mantchus. Ili was now entirely surrounded and it was resolved to reduce it by famine. The situation there was indeed frightful; all the provisions had been exhausted and the only food was horses, dogs and cats. Typhus so raged that from 50 to 100 men died daily.

During the Republic of China (1912–49), many northeastern Sibe joined anti-Japanese volunteer armies, while northwestern Sibe fought against the Kuomintang during the Ili Rebellion. After the Chinese Communist Revolution in 1949 established the People's Republic of China (PRC), large-scale educational and hygiene campaigns increased Sibe literacy and resulted in the eradication of Qapqal disease (a form of type A botulism).

In 1954, the PRC established the Qapqal Xibe Autonomous County to replace Ningxi County in Xinjiang, in the group's area of highest ethnic concentration.

Culture

Historical religions of the Sibe included shamanism and Buddhism. Customary Sibe attire included short buttoned jackets and trousers for men and close-fitting, long and lace-trimmed gowns for women. Arranged marriage was common and women had low social status, including no right to inherit property. Nowadays almost all the Sibe wear modern clothing and the traditional clothing is worn by elders during festivals. Traditionally, the Sibe were divided into hala, male-led clans consisting of people who shared the same surname. Until modern times, the dwellings of the Sibe housed up to three different generations from the same family, since it was believed that while the father was alive no son could break the family clan by leaving the house.

The Sibe in Northeast China speak Mandarin Chinese as their first language. In Xinjiang, descendants of the Qing dynasty military garrison speak the Xibe language, a Southern Tungusic language that underwent morphophonological changes and the adoption of loanwords from Xinjiang languages including Mandarin Chinese, Russian, Uyghur, and Kazakh.

The different ethnicities of Northern Xinjiang have shared music culture and adopted elements from each other's music.

Distribution 
According to the 2010 Chinese Census, there were 190,481 Sibe people in China: 99,571 males and 90,910 females. The largest Sibe population within China was in the province of Liaoning, home to 132,431 Sibe people, 69.52% of all Sibe people in China, but just 0.30% of Liaoning's total population. The autonomous region of Xinjiang is also some to a sizable amount of Sibe people: 34,399 in total, accounting for 18.06% of all Sibe people in China, and 0.16% of Xinjiang's total population. Outside of these two, Heilongjiang, Jilin, and Inner Mongolia have the largest Sibe populations, totaling 7,608, 3,113, and 3,000, respectively.

Xinjiang 
Approximately 43,000 Sibe people live in the autonomous region of Xinjiang, of which, approximately 34,000 live in the Ili Kazakh Autonomous Prefecture, where the Qapqal Xibe Autonomous County is located. As of 2018, 19,984 Sibe people live in the autonomous county, comprising 10.28% of its total population, which is dominated by larger groups, such as the Han Chinese, Uyghurs, and Kazakhs. In 2015, 20,426 Sibe people lived in the autonomous county, comprising 10.38% of its total population.

Notable individuals
Tong Liya – actress
Wu Qian – retired basketball player

References

Bibliography

Wu Yuanfeng, Zhao Zhiqiang. 1981. "Sibezu xiqian gaishu" [A general account of the westward migration of the Sibe]. Minzu yanjiu 2:22–29.
Ramsey, S. Robert. 1987. The Languages of China. Princeton University Press, Princeton New Jersey 
C. G. Mannerheimin Valokuvia Aasian-Matkalta 1906–1908 (Photographs By C. G. Mannerheim From His Journey Across Asia 1906–1908), (Otava, Keuruu: 1990) . Contains photographs of Sibe and other ethnic groups.

External links
Video on Sibe culture (in Chinese)
Website on Sibe archery
Mini Buleku A Recorded Sibe Dictionary
Sibe Culture (in Eng and Chinese)
The Sibe in the Early 20th Century by David Brophy, ANU

 
Tungusic peoples
Ethnic groups officially recognized by China